Saratoga Passage lies in Puget Sound between Whidbey Island and Camano Island.

Saratoga Passage extends about 18 miles in a northwesterly direction from its entrance between Sandy Point on the Whidbey Island side and Camano Head on the other. At its northern end, Saratoga Passage connects with Penn Cove and Crescent Harbor, and leads east into Skagit Bay.  Depths in the passage are from about 600 feet at the southeastern entrance to about 90 feet near Crescent Harbor.

Langley, Washington is the only city on either island located on the passage.

Most of the waterfront on either side is high bank of forested sand and clay banks.   There are four low bank communities on the Whidbey Island side of the passage: Sandy Point, Langley, Bells Beach and Fox Spit. The beaches are gravel and sand and the tide generally runs out a good distance.

There is considerable maritime traffic in these waters, mostly recreational and fishing boats, with occasional tugs bound to or from Deception Pass or the Swinomish Channel.  High-speed passenger ferries running between Seattle, Victoria and Friday Harbor use Saratoga Passage and Deception Pass as an alternative to crossing the Strait of Juan de Fuca in rough weather.  This area is generally considered a resort area.

Dungeness crab, clams and flatfish are abundant. In the past, strong salmon runs passed through on the way to the rivers on the mainland, but they have all but disappeared as have the once plentiful bait of candlefish and herring. Most of the fishing in southern end of Whidbey Island takes place on the western side, in Possession Sound, Mutiny Bay, or Double Bluff.

Saratoga Passage was named by Charles Wilkes, during the Wilkes Expedition of 1838–1842, for the Saratoga, the flagship of Thomas MacDonough during the Battle of Lake Champlain of the War of 1812. Wilkes had named Camano Island MacDonough Island, to honor the naval commander, but that name was removed when Henry Kellett reorganized the official British Admiralty charts in 1847. Wilkes' name MacDonough was changed to Camano to honor the Spanish explorer Jacinto Caamaño. Wilkes' name Saratoga Passage was retained. George Vancouver had previously, in 1792, named Saratoga Passage "Port Gardner", in honor of Vice-Admiral Sir Alan Gardner. Today the name Port Gardner survives as the bay and harbor of Everett. Port Susan, the water east of Camano Island, also given by Vancouver, survives and honors Lady Gardner, Sir Alan's wife.

References

Straits of Washington (state)
Bodies of water of Island County, Washington
Landforms of Puget Sound